M. A. Rogovin (1838- February 27, 1923) was a Russian civil engineer responsible for construction of many fortresses in Russia: Libau, Brest Fortress, Kovno among others.
The New York Times called Rogovin "a famous Russian engineer who built Libau and many fortresses".

References 

1838 births
1923 deaths
Russian civil engineers